Babaoğlu is a Turkish surname. Notable people with the surname include:

 Aydoğan Babaoğlu (born 1944), Turkish military officer
 Özalp Babaoğlu (born 1955), Turkish computer scientist

See also
 Babaoğlu, Çorum
 Babaoğlu, İnegöl

Turkish-language surnames